James Bannatyne (born 30 June 1975) is a former New Zealand association football goalkeeper. He last played for Team Wellington in the New Zealand Football Championship. Bannatyne is currently the assistant coach for Western Springs AFC in Auckland. He represented New Zealand at international level, generally as backup to Glen Moss and Mark Paston.

He has also played for the Football Kingz in the now-defunct Australian National Soccer League.

Bannatyne made his full All Whites debut in a 2–0 win over Cook Islands on 18 June 2001. He was included in the New Zealand squad for the 2009 FIFA Confederations Cup in South Africa, along with fellow non-professionals Aaron Scott and Andrew Barron.

On 10 May 2010, Bannatyne was named in New Zealand's final 23-man squad to compete at the 2010 FIFA World Cup. He retired from international football after returning from the World Cup.

His brother, Stu Bannatyne, is a round-the-world sailor.

See also
 New Zealand national football team
 New Zealand at the FIFA World Cup
 New Zealand national football team results
 List of New Zealand international footballers

References

External links

1975 births
Living people
Sportspeople from Lower Hutt
Association football goalkeepers
New Zealand association footballers
New Zealand international footballers
National Soccer League (Australia) players
Football Kingz F.C. players
Canterbury United players
Team Wellington players
People educated at Hutt Valley High School
2002 OFC Nations Cup players
2008 OFC Nations Cup players
2009 FIFA Confederations Cup players
2010 FIFA World Cup players